Deborah Andollo Lopez, also known as Deborah Andollo, (born in Havana in 1967) is a Cuban free-diving athlete who held several world records in different disciplines. In 1996, she set a free-diving record of about 357 feet.  On the "AIDA website’s world record history in both constant weight and No-Limits. In 1996 she excelled in constant  and no-limits , and did  in variable weight in Italy.

Career
According to On Cuba News in 2012, Andollo held "16 world records in four different divisions of apnea diving; she also won the 1996 Marine Oscar and was voted World’s Best Diver in 1997," and was "Twice included on the list of the country’s top 10 athletes (1996 and 1997) and chosen as one of the 100 Best Cuban Athletes of the 20th Century, [and] received the Platinum Pro5000 Diver Award in November 2011, a prize that is granted to outstanding divers who have completed more than 5,000 dives." Her nicknames "The Antillean mermaid," "Mermaid of the Deep", "Neptune’s Bride," and "Queen of the Caribbean," are related to her diving abilities.

This exceeds the depth most World War II submarines could descend before imploding."

In 1993, she hit the 80 meter mark in a variable-ballast direct-immersion dive lasting 2 minutes and 50 seconds. A year later, on July 5, 1994, she spent 2 minutes, 24 seconds to get down 61 meters with constant ballast, a women's world record. Then, on May 26, 1995, at Cayo Largo, she free-dived to  without mask or fins, in two minutes and 52 seconds.

There remained to break the mythical 107 meter variable ballast no limits record, set by Angela Bandini in November 1989. On May 16, 1996 at Pasaje Escondido, just off Punta Frances, Andollo mounted her 31 kg ballast sled for her world record attempt. She reached her base platform in 1 minute and 15 seconds.

She is heavily involved with the “Blue Yemaya Diving School, Havana", and became its spokesperson.  This is the centerpiece of a freediving educational program.  It is a partnership of Andollo, Cubanacan Nautica (a Cuban governmental association), and ACUC (Association of Canadian Underwater Councils).  In addition to free diving, the school teaches scuba diving and "ACUC, an international certifying agency, provides the accreditation of my freediving course,” which is a certification for free diving.  Andollo posits that diving is an interrelated family composed of "apnea, spearfishing/underwater hunting and scuba (air, nitrox, trimix)."  Training includes Yoga, mysticism and meditation.

Education

She earned a degree in Physical Education at Havana University and started out her athletic career in figure swimming in 1979. In 1992 she switched to breath-held diving, and came to the attention of trainer Omar Oramas. He could see that the petite Cubana, only  and  but with a  lung capacity, had the potential to reach great depths.

Personal life

Andollo Lopez is the mother of a son named Ernesto and a daughter. She is also engaged in audiovisual projects, teaches diving, and is involved in the ecological movement and environmental education. She resides in Mexico, and has a nonprofit diving academy.

Records
Records set by Andollo include the following.

References

External links
 https://web.archive.org/web/20111006024532/http://www.littleblueocean.com/freediving/content/fame.php 
 DeeperBlue.com Interview with Deborah Andollo

1967 births
Living people
Cuban freedivers
People from Havana
University of Havana alumni